La Noche is a Chilean cumbia band consisting of Gino Valerio, Alexis Morales, Ramiro Cruz, Sergio Taby Morales, Alexis Saldivar, Pablo Gato Martinez, Fernando Mambo Perez.

Discography 
Studio albums
2000: Pasión caliente
2001: Te Lo Dice
2006: Amor Entre Sabanas
2008: En tu cuarto
2009: La Noche Buena
2010: Sígueme
2014: Habitación 106

Live albums
2007: En Vivo
2009: En Vivo (Viña 2009)
2012: El Reencuentro

DVDs
2007: En Vivo
2009: La Noche Karaoke
2009: En Vivo (Viña 2009)

See also 
New Chilean Cumbia

References

External links 

Chilean cumbia
Chilean musical groups
Musical groups established in 2000
2000 establishments in Chile